The Zenith Centre is a high-rise office complex in Sydney, New South Wales, Australia designed by architectural firm Rice Daubney. It is located in the suburb of Chatswood, at the corner of Railway & McIntosh Streets. The Zenith Centre comprises two office towers totalling 43,750 m2 and offers an excellent standard of accommodation, having been developed in 1987 to a high A-grade specification. It has approximately 800 car spaces and large, efficient floor plates of over 1,000 m2. It also houses a theater on the ground level.

References 

Skyscrapers in Sydney
Office buildings in Sydney
Office buildings completed in 1987
Skyscraper office buildings in Australia